Alexandre Millerand (– ) was a French politician. He was Prime Minister of France from 20 January to 23 September 1920 and President of France from 23 September 1920 to 11 June 1924. His participation in Waldeck-Rousseau's cabinet at the start of the 20th century, alongside the Marquis de Galliffet, who had directed the repression of the 1871 Paris Commune, sparked a debate in the French Section of the Workers' International (SFIO) and in the Second International about the participation of socialists in bourgeois governments.

Biography

Early life and religion 
Millerand was brought up in Paris, to Jean-François Millerand and Amélie-Mélanie Cahen of Alsatian Jewish origin, while his paternal family originated from Franche-Comté.

Millerand was baptized in 1860, while his mother converted to Catholicism. However, Millerand later became an agnostic, even going as far as to participate in a civil marriage ceremony. He temporized later on letting his children being baptized as youth and he worked in favour of diplomatic links beetwen Holy See and French Republic. His funerals were celebrated in the Roman Catholic rite at Sainte Jeanne d'Arc Church in Versailles.

Early activism
Born in Paris, he was educated for the bar and was elected Secrétaire of the Conférence des avocats du barreau de Paris. He made his reputation through his defence, in company with Georges Laguerre, of Ernest Roche and Duc-Quercy, the instigators of the strike at Decazeville in 1883. He then took Laguerre's place on Georges Clemenceau's newspaper, La Justice. He was a freemason between 1883 and 1905.

He was elected to the Chamber of Deputies for the Seine département in 1885 as a Radical Socialist. He was associated with Clemenceau and Camille Pelletan as an arbitrator in the Carmaux strike (1892). He had long had the ear of the Chamber in matters of social legislation, and after the Panama scandals had discredited so many politicians, his influence grew.

He was chief of the Independent Socialist faction, a group which then mustered sixty members. Until 1896, he edited their organ in the press, La Petite République. His programme included the collective ownership of the means of production and the international association of labour.

Government minister
In June 1899 he entered Pierre Waldeck-Rousseau's cabinet of "republican defence" as Minister of Commerce. In contrast to his earlier activism, he now limited himself to practical reforms, devoting his attention to the improvement of the merchant marine, to the development of trade, of technical education, of the postal system, and to the amelioration of the conditions of labour. Labour questions were entrusted to a separate department, the Direction du Travail, and the pension and insurance office was also raised to the status of a "direction".

In 1902, he did not join fellow independent socialist Jean Jaurès in forming the Parti Socialiste Français, but in 1907 instead formed the small Independent Socialist Party, which became the Republican-Socialist Party (PRS) in 1911. His influence with the far-left had already declined, for it was said that his departure from the true Marxist tradition had disintegrated the movement.

In 1909/1910, he served as Minister of Public Works, Posts and Telegraphs.

As labour minister, he was responsible for the introduction of a wide range of reforms, including the reduction in the maximum workday from 11 to 10 hours in 1904, the introduction of an 8-hour workday for postal employees, the prescribing of maximum hours and minimum wages for all work undertaken by public authorities, the bringing of workers' representatives into the Conseil supérieur de travail, the establishment of arbitration tribunals and inspectors of labour, and the creation of a labour section inside his Ministry of Commerce to tackle the problem of social insurance.

The introduction of trade union representatives on the Supreme Labour Council, the organisation of local labour councils, and instructions to factory inspectors to put themselves in communication with the councils of the trade unions were valuable concessions to labour. He further secured the rigorous application of earlier laws devised for the protection of the working class. His name was especially associated with a project for the establishment of old age pensions, which became law in 1905. In 1898, he became editor of La Lanterne.

Millerand twice served as Minister of War, first from 1912 to 1913 and again, during the early stages of World War I, from 1914 to 1915.

Prime minister

Millerand continued to move to the right, being appointed Prime Minister by the conservative President, Paul Deschanel. During his time as Prime Minister, a decree of February 1920 introduced the eight-hour day for seamen.

Presidency and later years
When Deschanel had to resign later in 1920 due to his mental disorder, Millerand emerged as a compromise candidate for President between the Bloc National and the remnants of the Bloc des gauches. Millerand appointed Georges Leygues, a politician with a long career of ministerial office, as Prime Minister and attempted to strengthen the executive powers of the Presidency. This move was resisted in the Chamber of Deputies and the French Senate, and Millerand was forced to appoint a stronger figure, Aristide Briand. Briand's appointment was welcomed by both left and right, although the Socialists and the left wing of the Radical Party did not join his government.

However, Millerand dismissed Briand after just a year, and appointed the conservative republican Raymond Poincaré.

Millerand was accused of favouring conservatives in spite of the traditional neutrality of French Presidents and the composition of the legislature. On 14 July 1922, Millerand escaped an assassination attempt by Gustave Bouvet, a young French anarchist. Two years later, Millerand resigned in the face of growing conflict between the elected legislature and the office of the President, following the victory of the Cartel des Gauches. Gaston Doumergue, who was the president of the Senate at the time, was chosen to replace Millerand.

Millerand died in 1943 at Versailles, and was interred in the Passy Cemetery. He was awarded Serbian Order of Karađorđe's Star.

Millerand's Ministry, 20 January 1920 – 24 September 1920
 Alexandre Millerand - President of the Council and Minister of Foreign Affairs
 André Joseph Lefèvre - Minister of War
 Théodore Steeg - Minister of the Interior
 Frédéric François-Marsal - Minister of Finance
 Paul Jourdain - Minister of Labour
 Gustave L'Hopiteau - Minister of Justice
 Adolphe Landry - Minister of Marine
 André Honnorat - Minister of Public Instruction and Fine Arts
 André Maginot - Minister of War Pensions, Grants, and Allowances
 Joseph Ricard - Minister of Agriculture
 Albert Sarraut - Minister of Colonies
 Yves Le Trocquer - Minister of Public Works
 Auguste Isaac - Minister of Commerce and Industry
  - Minister of Liberated Regions

Gallery

See also
 Interwar France
 San Remo conference

Notes

References
  Endnotes:
 For his administration in the Waldeck-Rousseau cabinet see A. Lavy, L'Œuvre de Millerand (1902);
 his speeches between 1899 and 1907 were published in 1907 as Travail et travailleurs.

Further reading
 
 
 The Encyclopædia Britannica: a dictionary of arts, sciences, literature and general information, Volume 31 by Hugh Chisholm

External links

 
 
 

1859 births
1943 deaths
20th-century presidents of France
20th-century Princes of Andorra
Politicians from Paris
Republican-Socialist Party politicians
Princes of Andorra
French agnostics
Prime Ministers of France
French Ministers of Commerce and Industry
French Ministers of Posts, Telegraphs, and Telephones
French Ministers of Public Works, Posts and Telegraphs
Transport ministers of France
French Ministers of War
Government ministers of France
Members of the 4th Chamber of Deputies of the French Third Republic
Members of the 5th Chamber of Deputies of the French Third Republic
Members of the 6th Chamber of Deputies of the French Third Republic
Members of the 7th Chamber of Deputies of the French Third Republic
Members of the 8th Chamber of Deputies of the French Third Republic
Members of the 9th Chamber of Deputies of the French Third Republic
Members of the 10th Chamber of Deputies of the French Third Republic
Members of the 11th Chamber of Deputies of the French Third Republic
Members of the 12th Chamber of Deputies of the French Third Republic
French Senators of the Third Republic
Senators of Seine (department)
Senators of Orne
French Freemasons
French people of Jewish descent
Jewish agnostics
Lycée Louis-le-Grand alumni
Burials at Passy Cemetery
Recipients of the Order of the White Eagle (Poland)
20th-century French politicians
Grand Crosses of the Order of Saint-Charles